ČD Class 680 are EMUs operating in the Czech Republic, using tilting Pendolino technology intended for the SuperCity train service. Built by Alstom (originally Fiat Ferroviaria), they were largely based on the nine-car ETR 470.

History
The initial Czech order for tilting trains was placed with Fiat Ferroviaria during 2000.  As part of the Alstom take over of Fiat Ferroviaria the order was changed to Pendolino trains. The first set was delivered in 2004 as Pendolino ČD 680.

During the testing period, the train had problems with the Czech signaling system. The problems were reported to have been solved and the trains entered regular service in December 2005 between Prague and Ostrava. As of late January 2006, all five of the in-service trains suffered from software and operating problems, ranging from failing air conditioning and heating to malfunctions of the tilt controls. The supposedly ERTMS-compliant ATLAS control system is unable to properly connect several discrete systems, each based on different software platforms. Similar problems have also been reported with the Finnish VR Class Sm3. All problems were fixed.

In popular culture
The train was featured in the 2006 James Bond film Casino Royale. While in reality, the Pendolino does not actually operate the route, in the movie it was shown traveling from Switzerland to Montenegro.
In the 2008 movie Wanted, the train was featured with real Czech Railways logo and equipment.

Formation
The seven car units are composed as:

Cars are individually numbered, with the driving motors carrying their numbers on the nose.

Operations
Pendolino is used primarily for the SuperCity train service, which is the fastest train service of ČD.

In December 2006 Czech Pendolinos were given permission to operate in Slovakia and Austria.

In 2009 and 2011, one pair of ČD 680s operated as SuperCity Slovenská strela between Prague and Bratislava. However, it was cancelled due to a low demand, since the train was not actually faster, but more expensive.

As of 2020 ČD Pendolinos operated nine trips a day in each direction on the SuperCity train service under the name SuperCity Pendolino which is running the Prague-Pardubice-Olomouc-Ostrava route, with some continuing to Bohumín and one continuing to the Slovak city of Košice under the name SuperCity Pendlino Košičan. Twice a day the service is as extended as an InterCity train from Prague to Františkovy Lázně via Plzeň.

Accidents
 On December 1, 2007 a Pendolino derailed in Prague. No one was injured but the train was severely damaged.
 On July 22, 2015 train SC 512 en route from Bohumín to Františkovy Lázně collided with a truck at a railway crossing. Three passengers died and 17 people were injured.

See also
 List of ČD Classes
 List of high speed trains

References

External links
 
 Atlas Lokomotiv Website Czech
 Website about 680 class Czech
 fansite Czech

High-speed trains of the Czech Republic
Alstom multiple units
Articles containing video clips
Electric multiple units of the Czech Republic
Pendolino
Train-related introductions in 2004
3000 V DC multiple units
15 kV AC multiple units
25 kV AC multiple units